South Blooming Grove is a village inside the Town of Blooming Grove in Orange County, New York, United States. As of the 2020 census the population was 3,973. It is part of the Poughkeepsie–Newburgh–Middletown, NY Metropolitan Statistical Area as well as the larger New York–Newark–Bridgeport, NY-NJ-CT-PA Combined Statistical Area.

Robert Jeroloman was the village's first mayor. The Honorable James LoFranco was the second mayor. George Kalaj is the current mayor.

History 

The idea for incorporating a new village came in 2004 when a group called the South Blooming Grove Homeowner's Association was concerned about the rapid expansion of the sprawling Satmar Hasidim village of Kiryas Joel and hoped to prevent unchecked annexation of land for high-density residential housing by incorporating a section of the large, unincorporated area known as Blooming Grove. After gathering over 1,000 signatures in favor of the new village, a New York State Supreme Court Justice put things on hold in January 2005. Finally, on June 29, 2006, incorporation passed overwhelmingly, 856 votes to 89.

A similar incorporation vote was held on August 11, 2006 in the neighboring Town of Woodbury; it also passed by a wide margin.

On September 2, 2006, South Blooming Grove held its first board elections. The candidates for mayor (Robert Jeroloman) and four trustee seats (Garry Dugan, Jim Mulany, Dorine Sas and John Hickey) ran unopposed. All five have since been re-elected, again unopposed: Sas and Hickey in 2008 and 2012, and Dugan, Mulany and Jeroloman in 2010. In the 2014 elections, Mayor Jeroloman and Trustee Mulany were again re-elected, but Gary Dugan did not seek another term; James LoFranco was elected to Dugan's old seat.

Demographics

"South Blooming Grove village"

References
https://www.recordonline.com/story/news/politics/elections/2021/03/17/write-trustee-candidates-win-south-blooming-grove-election/4730372001/

External links 

Village of South Blooming Grove

Villages in New York (state)
Villages in Orange County, New York
Populated places established in 2006
Poughkeepsie–Newburgh–Middletown metropolitan area